Pınarca is a village in the central district of Hakkâri Province in Turkey. The village had a population of 166 in 2022.

The ten hamlets of Ayranlı, Çatdere, Çaylı, Hendek, Işıklı, Sarıköy, Taşlıca, Uğurlu and Yeniyol are attached to Pınarca.

Population 
Population history from 2007 to 2022:

References 

Villages in Hakkâri District
Kurdish settlements in Hakkâri Province